Russell Pope Trabue (May 20, 1900 – June 22, 1988) was an American baseball pitcher in the Negro leagues. He played with the Indianapolis ABCs in 1924.

References

External links
 and Seamheads

Indianapolis ABCs players
1900 births
1988 deaths
Baseball players from Indiana
Baseball pitchers
20th-century African-American sportspeople